Big Baller is the fourth solo studio album by American rapper MC Breed from Flint, Michigan. It was released on June 20, 1995 via Wrap Records with distribution by Ichiban Records. Recording sessions took place at Kala Recording Studios, Bosstown, and the Digital Edge in Atlanta. Production was handled by MC Breed, Flash, Shorty B, Carlos Glover, Brett Ski, Jazze Pha, Pee-Wee and Amp Fiddler. It features guest appearances from Jibri, Jazze Pha, DJ Hurricane, Joe Riz, Kool-Ace and Too $hort. Big Baller made it to number 143 on the Billboard 200, number 17 on the Top R&B/Hip-Hop Albums, and number 3 on the Top Heatseekers chart. Its lead single, "Sea of Bud", reached number 28 on the Hot Rap Songs chart.

Track listing

Charts

References

External links

1995 albums
MC Breed albums
Albums produced by Jazze Pha
Albums produced by Amp Fiddler